Chapel is a village located on Pennsylvania Route 29 and the Perkiomen Creek in Hereford Township, Berks County and Upper Hanover Township, Montgomery County in the U.S. state of Pennsylvania. It uses the 18070 zip code of Palm, which is located just to the southeast. It is served by the Upper Perkiomen School District and uses the area code of 215.

Unincorporated communities in Montgomery County, Pennsylvania
Unincorporated communities in Berks County, Pennsylvania
Unincorporated communities in Pennsylvania